Clint Richardson Jr. (born August 7, 1956) is an American former professional basketball player who was selected by the Philadelphia 76ers in the second round (36th pick overall) of the 1979 NBA draft. A 6'3" guard from Seattle University, Richardson played in nine NBA seasons, from 1980 to 1989, with the 76ers and the Indiana Pacers. He also played for one season (European Cup matches only) for one of the top Greek teams, AEK Athens, as well as a season in Italy. During his NBA career, Richardson played in 586 games and scored a total of 4,084 points. His best year as a professional came during the 1985-86 season as a member of the Pacers, appearing in 82 games and averaging 9.7 ppg. Richardson was a member of the 1982-83 76ers NBA championship team.

Early in his NBA career, Richardson cited Magic Johnson, Sidney Moncrief, Elston Turner, Michael Cooper and Don Collins as the best backcourt rebounders, most of whom were former college forwards.

References

External links
NBA stats at basketballreference.com
Seattle High School Sports Where Are They Now
76ers Welcome Back Julius Erving and Clint Richardson

1956 births
Living people
20th-century African-American sportspeople
21st-century African-American people
AEK B.C. players
African-American basketball players
American expatriate basketball people in Greece
American men's basketball players
Basketball players from Seattle
Greek Basket League players
Los Angeles Clippers players
Philadelphia 76ers draft picks
Philadelphia 76ers players
Seattle Redhawks men's basketball players
Shooting guards